William Mark Freund (6 July 194417 August 2020) was an American academic historian who was particularly known as an authority on the economic and labour history of Africa. His research focused primarily on South Africa. For much of his career, he taught at the University of Natal and its successor institution the University of KwaZulu-Natal. 

A self-described "materialist", Freund is best known for The Making of Contemporary Africa  (1984) which was widely praised as a survey of scholarship on the social and economic history of Africa in the colonial and post-colonial eras. He wrote widely on subjects related to African labour and urban history.

Biography
Freund was born in Chicago, Illinois on 6 July 1944. His parents were Austrian Jewish refugees who had arrived in the United States in 1939. He studied at the University of Chicago and later Yale University where he gained a PhD in 1971 on Dutch rule in the Cape under the Batavian Republic (1803–06). He later claimed that Eric Hobsbawm was a particular academic inspiration. Freund subsequently worked in a number of short-term posts in the United States and Africa, notably at Ahmadu Bello University in Nigeria from 1974 to 1978 and briefly the University of Dar es Salaam in Tanzania. However, he struggled to secure tenure until the publication of The Making of Contemporary Africa  (1984) which has been described as a "landmark in African historiography". 

The Making of Contemporary Africa provided an overview of the social and economic history of colonial and post-colonial Africa and was widely praised for its depth of research, including its bibliography which ran for 55 pages. It has been described as "the defining book of his life".

Freund was awarded a professorship in Economic History at the University of Natal (later the University of KwaZulu-Natal) in Durban, South Africa in 1986, and became interested in development studies. He co-founded the journal Transformation the same year, inspired by the New Left Review.

Freund was best known as an economic historian, particularly interested in capital accumulation and labour relations. He defined his own approach as a "materialist" rather than explicitly Marxist. His first work was Capital and Labour in the Nigerian Tin Mines (1981), inspired by the work of Charles van Onselen. He also published a notable synthesis of labour history in The African Worker (1988) as well as on urban history in Africa, notably the history of Durban itself.

Amid the end of Apartheid in South Africa, Freund served as an expert in political economy in committees established by the African National Congress to discuss future economic policy. Although sympathetic to African nationalism, Freund viewed the ANC with critical distance and was skeptical about its development policy. A festschrift was dedicated to him in 2006 and a special issue of African Studies was devoted to an assessment of his work. He authored an autobiography entitled Bill Freund: An Historian's Passage to Africa which appeared posthumously in 2021. He died in Durban on 27 August 2020.

Selected publications
Capital and Labour in the Nigerian Tin Mines (Humanities Press, 1981)
The Making of Contemporary Africa: The Development of African Society since 1800 (Macmillan, 1984), with new editions in 1998 and 2016;
The African Worker (Cambridge, 1988)
Insiders and Outsiders: The Indian Working Class of Durban, 1910-1990 (University of Natal, 1995)
The African City: A History (Cambridge, 2007)
Twentieth-Century South Africa: A Developmental History (Cambridge, 2018).
Bill Freund: An Historian’s Passage to Africa (Wits University Press, 2021)

References

Bibliography

Further reading

1944 births
2020 deaths
Academic staff of the University of KwaZulu-Natal
People from Chicago
American emigrants to South Africa
American people of Austrian-Jewish descent
Historians of South Africa
Economic historians
Labor historians
American Africanists
American economic historians
Academic staff of Ahmadu Bello University
Yale Graduate School of Arts and Sciences alumni
American Marxist historians
Academic staff of the University of Natal
South African socialists
Urban historians
Academic staff of the University of Dar es Salaam
Historians of Africa
University of Chicago alumni
South African Marxists
20th-century American historians
American male non-fiction writers
Historians from Illinois
20th-century American male writers
Historians of Nigeria